Drumcondra Public Library is an art deco style public library in Drumcondra, Dublin designed by Robert Sorley Lawrie working in the city architect's office under Horace O'Rourke.

This building was one of four similar libraries built by Dublin Corporation between 1935 and 1940 in the Dublin suburbs of Phibsborough, Ringsend, Drumcondra and Inchicore.

See also
Ringsend Public Library
Inchicore Public Library
Phibsborough Public Library

References

 
Buildings and structures in Dublin (city)
Libraries in the Republic of Ireland
Art Deco architecture in the Republic of Ireland
Libraries established in 1937